Yadava College is an autonomous co-educational institution in Madurai, Tamil Nadu, India. It is affiliated with Madurai Kamaraj University and is located in Thiruppalai Madurai 14. The college was established in 1969 by the Yadava community, led by the late Shri. E. Rengasamy, the late Shri. Govindarajan and the late Shri. D. Nagendran.

Description

Yadava College has been accredited with "A" grade by the National Assessment and Accreditation Council and offers 13 undergraduate, seven postgraduate, three research degrees, and Certificate and Diploma programmes.

Scholarships
Students with 90% attendance are eligible for the following scholarships.
 Indian government scholarship
 State government scholarship (backward classes)
 State government scholarship ([SC/ST] welfare)
 Fee concession as per Tamil Nadu Education rules 92
 National scholarships under Indian government
 Educational concessions for the wards of defense personnel
 National loan scholarship
 Indian government scholarship for the physically handicapped
 State level college educational scholarship
 Tamil Nadu educational endowment scholarship
 Physically handicapped educational scholarship
 scheduled Castes eligible prize amount
 State Government financial assistance for the wards of farmers

Undergraduate courses
 B.A. Tamil
 B.A. History
 B.Sc. Mathematics
 B.Sc. Chemistry
 B.Sc. Physics
 B.Sc. Zoology
 B.Com.
 B.Sc. C.S.
 B.Sc. I.T.
 B.Sc. BioChemistry
 B.Sc. Microbiology
 B.Com.
 B.C.A.
 B.B.A.
 B.Sc. Software

Postgraduate courses
 M.A. Tamil
 M.Sc. Zoology
 M.Com
 M.Sc. C.S.
 M.Sc. I.T.
 M.Sc. Mathematics
 M.Sc. Physics
 M.A. English

Research
 M.Phil Tamil
 Ph.D Tamil
 M.Phil Commerce
 Ph.D Commerce
 M.Phil Zoology
 Ph.D Zoology

Weekend courses
Weekend courses are offered through Bharathiar University.
 M.C.A. 3 year
 M.B.A. 2 year

Library
The college library is a  building. The library has 41,000 volumes, including 48 journals of different disciplines,  a digital library which includes rare books and college magazines on CD, daily newspapers, magazines, a talking book library, and a back volume section. The library is fully computerized and has internet access for research and higher learning. There is an open online public access catalogue, a reprography section, audio visual facilities, and a language lab. The Reader's Forum is a group for readers from around the college. Dr.N.Vasanthakumar Headed the Library from 2010 to 2013.

See also
E.M.G. Yadava Women's College

References

External links
 College Official Website

Colleges in Madurai
Educational institutions established in 1969
1969 establishments in Tamil Nadu
Colleges affiliated to Madurai Kamaraj University
Universities and colleges in Madurai